Joseph Stanley Faulder (October 19, 1937 – June 17, 1999) was the first Canadian citizen to be executed in the United States since 1952.

Stanley Faulder, a Jasper, Alberta native, was convicted of murdering Inez Scarborough Phillips, a 75-year-old woman, in Texas in 1975 during a robbery in her house. He was caught, convicted, and sentenced to death in 1977. Faulder had previously served three years in prison for auto theft in Canada.

Despite diplomatic complaints by the Canadian government, Faulder was executed by lethal injection on June 17, 1999. His last appeal was rejected about an hour before his death. He is buried at Captain Joe Byrd Cemetery.

See also 
 Capital punishment in Texas
 Capital punishment in the United States
 List of people executed in Texas, 1990–1999

References 

 Offender Information. Texas Department of Criminal Justice. Retrieved on 2021-03-26.
 Randall, Kate. US high court upholds death sentence of Canadian on death row in Texas. World Socialist Web Site (1999-01-27). Retrieved on 2008-02-02.
 Randall, Kate. Texas executes Canadian Stanley Faulder World Socialist Web Site (1999-06-19). Retrieved on 2008-02-02.

1937 births
1999 deaths
People executed for murder
Executed Canadian people
20th-century executions by Texas
People executed by Texas by lethal injection
Canadian people executed abroad
People from Jasper, Alberta
People convicted of murder by Texas
Canadian people convicted of murder